Stephen Carpenter (born 1970) is an American musician. Stephen Carpenter may also refer to:

 Stephen Carpenter (writer) (fl. 1980s–2010s), American writer, film director, and cinematographer
 Stephen Cullen Carpenter (1752–1830), British-American journalist
 Stephen Decatur Carpenter (1818–1862), U.S. Army officer
 Stephen R. Carpenter (born 1952), American lake ecologist

See also
 Steve Carpenter (born 1971), Canadian ice hockey defenceman
 Steve Carpenter (American football) (born 1958), American football defensive back